Admontia nasoni is a species of bristle fly in the family Tachinidae.

Distribution
Canada, United States.

References

Exoristinae
Taxa named by Daniel William Coquillett
Diptera of North America
Insects described in 1895